James Thomas Tague  (October 17, 1936 – February 28, 2014) was a car salesman who received minor injuries during the assassination of United States President John F. Kennedy in Dallas, Texas, on November 22, 1963. Tague received a minor wound to his right cheek caused by tiny pieces of concrete debris from a street curb that was struck by fragments from a bullet that was fired at Kennedy. Besides Kennedy and Texas Governor John B. Connally, Tague was the only other person known to have been struck as a result of gunfire at Dallas's Dealey Plaza that day.

Life
Tague was born on a farm near Plainfield, Indiana. He dropped out of Purdue University to join the United States Air Force. He graduated from the United States Air Force School of Aerospace Medicine and became a car salesman in Dallas, Texas.

Kennedy assassination
Tague had been driving to Downtown Dallas to have lunch with his girlfriend (and future wife) when he came upon a traffic jam caused by the presidential motorcade that was traveling west on Elm Street. Tague testified to the Warren Commission that because of the traffic, he parked his car on the north curb of Commerce Street, where he then "got out of his car and stood by the bridge abutment." Tague was a few feet north of the southern edge of the triple underpass railroad bridge when he saw the presidential limousine and heard the first shot.

As with many other witnesses, Tague remembered hearing this first shot and likened it to a firecracker. He later testified that the first shot that he recalled hearing had occurred after the presidential limousine had already completed the 120-degree slow turn from Houston Street onto Elm Street and then straightened out. The motorcade then proceeded in his direction down Elm Street, parallel to Commerce Street.

Soon after the shots were fired, Tague was approached by Dallas Detective Buddy Walthers, who noticed specks of blood on Tague's right cheek. Tague also had a small left facial scab from a cut, which occurred a week before the assassination. The detective asked Tague where he had been standing. The two men then examined the area and discovered, on the upper, curved part of Main Street south curb, a "very fresh scar" impact that they believed indicated that a bullet had struck there and had taken a small chip out of the curb's concrete. They came to the conclusion that one bullet had ricocheted off the curb and the debris then hit Tague. The curb surrounding the scar chip was not cut out until August 1964, after Tague had repeatedly reminded authorities of also being wounded during the shots, and it is now in the National Archives. The detective told Tague that it appeared that a bullet had been fired from either the Texas School Book Depository or the Dal-Tex Building.

After assassination

Warren Commission and FBI
Tague was called by the Warren Commission to testify on July 23, 1964. He initially stated that he had been wounded on his cheek by the second or the third of the three shots that he remembered hearing. When the commission's counsel pressed him to be more specific, Tague testified that he had been wounded by the second shot. When asked from where he felt the gunshots had come, Tague testified that they were "coming from my left ... by the, whatever you call the monument," which was the area of the North Pergola monument, located on the north grassy knoll, several hundreds of feet apart from and west of the Texas School Book Depository building.

According to the Warren Commission's final report, forensic tests by the FBI revealed that the chipped bullet mark impact location contained no embedded copper metal residue, which indicated that it was not created by "an unmutilated military full metal-jacketed bullet such as the bullet from Governor Connally's stretcher." In Tague's Truth Withheld, he published pictures of the wound that were taken on November 23, 1963.

Books and events
In 2003, forty years after the assassination, Tague published a book called Truth Withheld, detailing his experiences during and after the assassination. He wrote that he was injured after the second shot.

In 2011, Tague revisited the scene of his injury for the researcher Max Holland's investigation into the first shot for the documentary JFK: The Lost Bullet.

In 2013, Tague published his second book, LBJ and the Kennedy Killing, which claimed that Vice President Lyndon B. Johnson and his associates were involved in the assassination.

Later life and death
Tague became a car salesman in Bonham, Texas, where he retired. He died there on February 28, 2014, at the age of 77.

See also 
 Single-bullet theory

References

External links
 
 William M. Goggins, James Tague: Unintended Victim in Dealey Plaza.

1936 births
2014 deaths
American victims of crime
Military personnel from Indiana
People from Plainfield, Indiana
People from Bonham, Texas
Purdue University alumni
Writers from Indiana
Writers from Texas
Witnesses to the assassination of John F. Kennedy